Mientras haya un circo is a 1958 Argentine comedy film directed by Carlos F. Borcosque and starring Adrianita and
Carlos Borsani.

Cast
 Adrianita
 Carlos Borsani
 Guillermo Longoni
 Mercedes Carreras
 Eber Lobato
 Nélida Lobato
 María Luisa Santés
 Carlos Gouthié
 Carlos Borcosque (junior)
 Oscar Orlegui

References

External links
 

1958 films
1950s Spanish-language films
Argentine black-and-white films
Films directed by Carlos F. Borcosque
Argentine comedy films
1958 comedy films
1950s Argentine films